Alphabetical may refer to:

 Alphabetical order, a ranking of words by the conventional ordering of an alphabet
 Alphabetical (album), a 2004 album by the French indie pop band Phoenix
 Alphabetical (game show), a British television game show